The Crooked World is a BBC Books original novel written by Steve Lyons and based on the long-running British science fiction television series Doctor Who. It features the Eighth Doctor, Fitz and Anji.

Plot
The Doctor accidentally brings the concept of reality to a world based on cartoon physics.

Continuity
The concept of a person's belief affecting a creature also featured in Lyons's previous novel Salvation.

Outside references
All the characters are parodies of popular cartoon characters, though none are mentioned by name.

Reception
In Interzone, Matt Hills writes, "Lyon's tenth Who novel seems at first as if it is going to be a very long set of tiresome in-jokes and references. But it opens out into a sharply drawn meditation on social justice and individual guilt, as well as dealing with the cultural transmission of ideas."

References

External links
The Cloister Library - The Crooked World

2002 British novels
2002 science fiction novels
Eighth Doctor Adventures
Novels by Steve Lyons